Rogerio Alves dos Santos (born 2 August 1996), often known as China, is a Brazilian professional footballer who plays as a striker for FC Aktobe, on loan from FC Lviv.

Career
China is a product of the Clube Atlético Juventus academy system.

In March 2017 he signed a five-year deal with Ukrainian side FC Karpaty Lviv. He made his debut in the Ukrainian Premier League against FC Vorskla Poltava on 21 May.

References

External links

1996 births
Living people
Footballers from São Paulo
FC Karpaty Lviv players
FC Lviv players
FC Aktobe players
Ukrainian Premier League players
Brazilian footballers
Brazilian expatriate footballers
Expatriate footballers in Ukraine
Brazilian expatriate sportspeople in Ukraine
Expatriate footballers in Kazakhstan
Brazilian expatriate sportspeople in Kazakhstan
Association football forwards